The Chorus Paulinus or CHOPA is a choir in the Philippines. It is known for its a cappella-style blending of voices that creates a sound reflective of its high choral standards.

Founder
Arnold Zamora (born February 10, 1961) is a Filipino musician from Tagbilaran City, Bohol, Philippines who has carved for himself a name in the national music industry as a singer, composer, arranger and conductor.  As a seminarian at the UST Central seminary, he founded the Psalterion Choir.  At the University of the Philippines, he joined the Philippine Madrigal Singers or MADZ and is the founder of the Chorus Paulinus. He is also the founder and music director of the Singing Priests of Tagbilaran.

He currently works for the Archdiocese of San Francisco in San Francisco, California, United States.

Discography

Albums
 Chorus Paulinus (SLO), San Luis Obispo, California, May 27, 2001
 Blessed Be God, A Cappella, 9 choral arrangements of popular religious songs, arranged by Arnold Zamora, Chorus Paulinus, 1999
 Joy of Christmas, a CD album released in the United States, 1999

Awards
 1993 – National Chorale Competition (sponsored by Caritas Manila and DTI), Grand Prize winner
 1998 – Awit Para sa Bayan (Centennial Choral Competition), Best Choice Piece and Grand Prize winner
 1999 – I Concurso Coral de Ateneo, Best Mixed Choir
 1999 – UP Los Banos Choral Competition, Grand Prize Winner
 2003 – 1st Wedding Expo Philippines Choir Competition, 1st Runner-up

Major concerts
 March 1995 – Into the Light, UP Abelardo Hall
 April 1996 – LAKAT (Lakbay Abot Kanta), CCP Little Theatre
 March 1997 – The Journey, Philam Life Theater
 December 1997 – An Evening with Chorus Paulinus, Hearts of Jesus and Mary Parish
 November 1998 – In Harmony, PCIB Tower II
 April 1999 – Simply Chorus Paulinus (an anniversary concert), CCP Little Theater
 April 2000 – Chorus Paulinus VIII, Philam Life Theater
 December 2000 – An Evening with Chorus Paulinus, Hearts of Jesus and Mary Parish
 April 2001 – CP@Nine, PCIB Tower I Theater
 November 2002 – Chorus Paulinus...Ten Years After, Philam Life Theater
 November 2003 – Himig Chorus Paulinus, Philam Life Theater
 October 2015 – Sperare, Hearts of Jesus and Mary Parish

Outreach programs
 May 1995 – Into the Light, Key Cities of Bohol and Cebu
 May 1996 – LAKAT (CCP Outreach), Visayas Tour
 May 1997 – LAWIG (CCP Outreach), Mindanao Tour
 April 1998 – In Harmony, Bohol Tour
 May 1999 – U.S. Tour
 May 2000 – Chorus Paulinus VIII, U.S. Tour
 May 2001 – CP @ Nine, U.S. Tour
 November 2015 – St. Therese's Story of the Soul, Clark County Library Performing Arts Center, Las Vegas, Nevada, USA

See also
 Philippine Madrigal Singers
 Ryan Cayabyab

References

Further reading
 CP@Nine Souvenir Program.  April 2001.
 Catholic San Francisco May 7, 1999
  Malaya.com.ph May 2001.
 Arcie M. Sercado. Dong Montalvo: Cash and (Musical) Notes Supreme Court of the Philippines.
 One week with Madz et al. The Manila Times. May 1, 2006

External links
 Chorus Paulinus at Weddingpals.com

Filipino choirs
Musical groups from Metro Manila
Musical groups established in 1992